King Gye was the 9th king of Mahan confederacy. He reigned from 33 BCE to 17 BCE. His true name was Gye.

References

See also 
 List of Korean monarchs
 History of Korea

Monarchs of the Mahan confederacy
1st-century BC Korean people